In Irish traditional history Eógan (or Eoghan Mór—a name also used by his grandfather, Mug Nuadat), eldest son of Ailill Ollamh, was a 2nd or 3rd century AD king of Munster. He is credited with founding or at least giving his name to the Eóganachta, a dynasty which ruled as kings of Munster and later princes of Desmond until the late 16th century. The son of Eógan Mór was Fiachu Muillethan. His mother was Sadb ingen Chuinn, daughter of Conn of the Hundred Battles.

References

Further reading 
Eoghanacht Genealogies Excerpt From The Book of Munster Written in 1703 Rev. Eugene O'Keeffe Parish priest and Poet of Doneraile, North Cork

See also
 Deirgtine
 Leath Cuinn and Leath Moga

Cycles of the Kings
Eóganachta
Legendary High Kings of Ireland